Akyaka may refer to several places:

 Akyaka, Ardahan, Turkey
 Akyaka, Bozdoğan, Turkey
 Akyaka, Burdur
 Akyaka, Demirözü, Turkey
 Akyaka, Kars, Turkey
 Akyaka railway station, in Akyaka, Kars
 Akyaka, Muğla, Turkey